Statistics of the Scottish Professional Football League (SPFL) in season 2018–19.

Scottish Premiership

Scottish Championship

Scottish League One

Scottish League Two

Award winners

Yearly 

 Tarton Boot winner: Kevin Nisbet and Blair Henderson (shared as joint-highest goalscorers in the SPFL)
 The Tartan Ball was awarded to highest scorer in each division of the SPFL.

Monthly

See also
2018–19 in Scottish football

References

 
Scottish Professional Football League seasons